Pterostylis aphylla, commonly known as the leafless greenhood, is a species of orchid endemic to Tasmania. As with similar greenhoods, the flowering plants differ from those which are not flowering. The non-flowering plants have a rosette of leaves flat on the ground but in this species, the flowering plants have a single green and white flower with a brown tip and lack leaves apart from a few small scales.

Description
Pterostylis aphylla is a terrestrial, perennial, deciduous, herb with an underground tuber. Flowering plants have up to five moderately crowded green and white flowers with a dark brown tip, on a  flowering spike, . The dorsal sepal and petals are fused, forming a hood or "galea" over the column. The dorsal sepal is erect near its base, then curves forward with a short point. The sinus between the bases of the lateral sepals curves inward and has a small notch in the centre. Flowering occurs from October to March.

Taxonomy and naming
Pterostylis aphylla was first formally described in 1840 by John Lindley from a specimen collected in the north-east of Tasmania and the description was published in The Genera and Species of Orchidaceous Plants.

Distribution and habitat
The leafless greenhood is widespread in Tasmania where it grows in forest, heath and buttongrass moorland.

References

aphylla
Endemic orchids of Australia
Orchids of Tasmania
Plants described in 1840